Goodnight Sweetheart is the debut studio album by American country music artist David Kersh, released on October 1, 1996. It contains the hit singles "Breaking Hearts and Taking Names", "Goodnight Sweetheart", "Another You", and "Day In, Day Out". Respectively, these reached #65, #6, #3, and #11 on Billboard Hot Country Singles & Tracks (now Hot Country Songs). "Another You" was written by Brad Paisley.

Track listing

Personnel
Eddie Bayers — drums
Bruce Bouton — steel guitar, slide guitar
David Briggs — piano
Jerry Douglas — Dobro, slide guitar
John Dymond — bass guitar
Thom Flora — background vocals
Larry Franklin — fiddle
David Kersh — lead vocals, background vocals
Chris Leuzinger — electric guitar
Brent Mason — electric guitar
Michael Rhodes — bass guitar
Matt Rollings — piano
Brent Rowan — electric guitar
Biff Watson — acoustic guitar
John Willis — electric guitar
Lonnie Wilson — drums
Curtis Young — background vocals

Chart performance

References

1996 debut albums
Curb Records albums
David Kersh albums